Funny Face and The Sandy Duncan Show are two American sitcoms aired by CBS starring Sandy Duncan as part of its 1971 and 1972 fall lineups, respectively. Both series were created and produced by Carl Kleinschmitt.  

In the spring of 1971, after having appeared in numerous television commercials and having a great success on Broadway in the 1970 revival of The Boy Friend (which won her a Tony Award nomination for Best Actress In a Musical), Sandy Duncan's show business career was quickly ascending. She had just completed her first major motion picture - The Million Dollar Duck for Walt Disney and was about to start on her second film - the screen adaptation of the Neil Simon play Star Spangled Girl which was to be produced and released by Paramount Pictures. Duncan was also signed by Paramount to film a television pilot loosely based on the 1957 film musical Funny Face which they hoped would be picked up by CBS to be part of their 1971–1972 fall television schedule. A pilot was filmed in the spring of 1971 and CBS executives were very enthusiastic. As a result, Duncan was already being touted by the network as the brightest new star of the 1971 fall season.

Funny Face 
In Funny Face, Sandy Stockton is a young UCLA student from Taylorville, Illinois, majoring in education and making ends meet by working part-time as an actress in TV commercials for the Prescott Advertising Agency. In the pilot for the series, the supporting cast included Nita Talbot as Maggie Prescott, Sandy's modeling agent and best friend, and Frank Aletter as Dick, a photographer for the agency, who also happened to be Maggie's ex-husband. After screening the pilot, CBS picked up the show for the 1971 fall season, however the network requested there be some changes made in terms of cast and format. As a result, the character of Sandy Stockton, instead, became a student teacher who supported her education through professional acting and modeling. Talbot and Aletter were dropped from the cast and replaced by Valorie Armstrong as Sandy's best friend and neighbor Alice McRaven (Armstrong and Duncan in real-life are close friends) and Henry Beckman and Kathleen Freeman as Pat and Kate Harwell, Sandy's friends and landlords. Beckman, in fact, had been featured in the pilot as a telephone repairman. The show was scheduled to air Saturday nights at 8:30 pm on CBS in the fall of 1971 between All in the Family and The New Dick Van Dyke Show. Unlike sitcoms that were recorded with live studio audiences, Funny Face was filmed with a laugh track. During the summer of 1971, excerpts of the pilot of the series were extensively used by CBS in their commercials of the new fall season to promote the program. However, when Funny Face premiered on September 18, 1971, the pilot was discarded as the first installment in favor of a later-filmed episode entitled "The Used Car".  Many critics dismissed the series as being insipid, including John J. O'Connor of The New York Times, who wrote: ‘Funny Face’ is constructed as a showcase for Sandy Duncan, an attractive performer whose particular brand of cuteness monopolized the reviews in a recent Broadway revival of “The Boy Friend.” The TV problem is how to harness that cuteness without falling into the sticky Doris Day pit, how to make Sandy a cutely gutsy version of 'real people'. The opening episode, with Miss Duncan's bachelor girl selling used cars in television commercials, didn't succeed. Sandy just looked tired, or perhaps a bit bored." (The New York Times TV Review by John J. O'Connor - September 20, 1972,  p.53)  However, other critics liked Duncan, especially Cleveland Amory, the critic of TV Guide, who called her "a wonderful comedienne."  Thanks to a favorable time slot, Funny Face ranked #8 in the Nielsen ratings for the 1971–72 season, obtaining a 23.9 rating tying it with Adam-12. 
Nonetheless, CBS suspended production of the show less than three months after its premiere. During the filming of Funny Face, Duncan developed headaches that proved to be due to a brain tumor behind her left eye. She was forced to have an operation which caused the loss of sight in that one eye. At that time, only 12 episodes had been filmed so, in order to complete the first 13-episode cycle, the pilot was dusted off and finally shown as the last show of the series on December 11, 1971.

CBS announced that the series would return the following fall, thereby giving Duncan time to recover from her surgery, but also providing the network time to retool the program. In the spring of 1972, Duncan was nominated for an Emmy Award for Outstanding Continued Performance By An Actress In a Leading Role In A Comedy Series for Funny Face.

The Sandy Duncan Show 

When the series returned in the fall of 1972, it underwent a major renovation. This included renaming the program from Funny Face to The Sandy Duncan Show, as well as having new cast members, an additional producer, different writers, a slightly revised format, as well as filming it with three cameras in front of a live audience. In The Sandy Duncan Show, Sandy now worked for the advertising firm of Quinn & Cohen, where her supervisor was one of the partners, Bert Quinn (Tom Bosley); the other partner was Leonard Cohen (Alfie Wise). Two of her neighbors, Kay Fox (Marian Mercer) and Alex Lembeck (M. Emmet Walsh) were also close friends. Motorcycle police officer Alex constantly worried about Sandy's status as a single woman living alone, which he saw as being inherently dangerous; and as such, appointed himself as her chaperone/protector. Sandy had a very sweet and slightly naive nature and was prone to try to help anyone who she felt needed help, including total strangers, so Alex's fears were not totally misplaced.

Despite these changes,  The Sandy Duncan Show was not successful. Although the critics generally liked Duncan, many of them did not find the show greatly improved or vastly different from Funny Face. Once again, television critic John J. O'Connor, of The New York Times, panned the series. O'Connor wrote: 'The Sandy Duncan Show' is supposed to be an altered version of 'Funny Face', a series that was cut short last season as Miss Duncan underwent eye surgery. The new series, though, is almost completely new and, with Miss Duncan as the bachelor girl with kooky neighbors and kooky co‐workers, it is trying desperately, somewhat pathetically, to repeat the style and content of 'The Mary Tyler Moore Show'. Let's just say it doesn't. Any details might verge on unnecessary cruelty." (The New York Times "TV: C.B.S. Still Serious About Series Comedies" by John J. O'Connor, p. 62)  Also, moving the show to Sunday nights did not help in terms of viewership. The series attracted a much smaller audience on Sunday nights than Funny Face had the previous year on Saturday nights, especially when it had the strong lead-in of All In The Family. The Sandy Duncan Show was scheduled to air Sundays at 8:30 pm for the fall of 1972 between M*A*S*H and The New Dick Van Dyke Show, forcing it to compete with ABC's The F.B.I. and the NBC Mystery Movie. As a result, it was also canceled at midseason,  with the last episode (#13) airing on New Year's Eve, 1972.

Theme song and opening titles 
Both Funny Face and The Sandy Duncan Show used the same theme song and opening titles. The opening titles consist of a photo album with pictures of Sandy Stockton as she was growing up from infancy to a young woman (presumably real-life photos of Duncan, used for the montage). Included were pictures of Sandy at various young ages; also pictures of her doing tap and ballet dancing; at various school functions; being a cheerleader for her high school; wearing her cap and gown, and posing by the Taylorville sign saying good bye as she was boarding her bus.

However, in The Sandy Duncan Show's opening, most of the pictures of a baby Sandy were eliminated, as there was now a second verse of the song, and that second verse was sung while showing Sandy on her bus trip from Taylorville to Los Angeles (which was actually footage of Duncan from her 1971 Paramount film 'Star Spangled Girl').  In Funny Face, the theme song "The Kind of Girl She Is" was sung by Jack Jones and later on in The Sandy Duncan Show, a more up-tempo version of the theme was sung by an uncredited group of men and women.  The theme was written by Alan and Marilyn Bergman and Dave Grusin.

Episodes

Funny Face

The Sandy Duncan Show

References

External links

Funny Face
Funny Face
1970s American sitcoms
CBS original programming
Television series by CBS Studios
Television shows set in Los Angeles
1972 American television series debuts
1972 American television series endings